Karla Maria "Carla" Tichatschek (6 January 1941 – 29 January 2015) was an Italian figure skater who competed in ladies' singles. She represented Italy at the 1960 Winter Olympics in Squaw Valley, California. She also appeared at four World Championships and three European Championships.

Competitive highlights

References 

1941 births
2015 deaths
Figure skaters at the 1960 Winter Olympics
Italian female single skaters
Olympic figure skaters of Italy
Sportspeople from Merano